Brendon John Diamanti (born 30 April 1981) is a former New Zealand international cricketer who played limited over cricket internationally and for Central Districts and Canterbury domestically. Diamanti was awarded a player's contract for 2006-07.

International career
On 21 January 2009, Diamanti was selected for the New Zealand squad for the one-day series against Australia in February 2009, and made his debut in the final match of the series on 13 February 2009. Diamanti played in the 2009 ICC Champions Trophy.

External links

 
 

1981 births
Living people
New Zealand cricketers
New Zealand One Day International cricketers
New Zealand Twenty20 International cricketers
Canterbury cricketers
Central Districts cricketers
Cricketers from Blenheim, New Zealand
New Zealand people of Italian descent
People educated at Marlborough Boys' College
South Island cricketers